Listed below are characters from all of the Castlevania video games in the order of their introduction and the game's release.

Castlevania and Simon's Quest

Dracula

His real name is Dracula Vlad Tepes, and is estimated to be over 800-years old by Castlevania: Symphony of the Night (1997). With a few exceptions, he has starred in every title. The series mainly takes place in the eponymous castle of Count Dracula, who resurrects every hundred years to take over the world. Players often assume the role of the Belmonts, a family of vampire hunters who have defeated Dracula for centuries with the Vampire Killer, a legendary whip. 

First seen in Castlevania (1986), Dracula is a vampire who was once defeated by Christopher Belmont a hundred years ago in Transylvania. He rises from the dead after his followers hold a black mass. Christopher's descendant, Simon Belmont, enters Dracula's castle and defeats him. Later titles introduce Dracula's son, the dhampir Alucard, who sided with Trevor Belmont against his father. In Symphony of the Night, Alucard's mother was revealed to be Lisa, a human Dracula fell in love with. Her execution for false charges of witchcraft left him griefstricken. 

The 2010 reboot, Castlevania: Lords of Shadow, reintroduces Dracula as Gabriel Belmont. Gabriel is a member of the Brotherhood of Light who fights a malevolent force called the Lords of Shadow in order to obtain the God Mask, which he believes can bring back his deceased wife, Marie. Gabriel eventually becomes a vampire and stars as Dracula in the sequels Castlevania: Lords of Shadow - Mirror of Fate (2013) and Castlevania: Lords of Shadow 2 (2014), where he is looking for a way to put an end to his immortality.

Death
 is present in all Castlevania games, except for Haunted Castle, Castlevania: The Adventure and Castlevania II: Belmont's Revenge. Death is often a boss fought toward the end of the game. He is considered Dracula's second-in-command and most trusted minion. Sometimes he has played an important role to the storyline, such as Castlevania: Lament of Innocence. He is a playable character as the skeletal knight in Castlevania Judgment.

In most of his appearances, Death closely resembles the cultural personification of the Grim Reaper, being a legless skeleton in a hooded cloak with a scythe. Like Dracula, but in a lot fewer games, he can change into a second form upon being defeated in the game.

He is voiced by Dennis Falt in Symphony of the Night, Patrick Seitz in The Dracula X Chronicles and Order of Ecclesia, Douglas Rye in Judgment and Tom Wyner in earlier games. Death also appears in the 2018 crossover fighting game Super Smash Bros. Ultimate as a background character on the Dracula's Castle stage. Simon and Richter's reveal trailer features Death claiming the soul of a panicked Luigi before Simon intervenes.

The character of Zobek, Lord of the Dead (voiced by Patrick Stewart) in the reboot Castlevania: Lords of Shadow has been speculated to be the version of Death of this universe, due to his relationship with Dracula. Additionally, the Lord of the Necromancers is at one point referred to as "Death itself". In the game's sequel, when Gabriel Belmont is forced into a confrontation with Zobek sheds his human form and takes on a more traditionalized appearance of Death (including wielding a large scythe).

Death appears as the antagonist of the final season of the Castlevania animated series, voiced by Malcolm McDowell. Here, Death is not the actual personification of death, but a spiritual entity who feeds on death similar to, but distinct from, a vampire. Assuming the guises of an Alchemist and Varney of London, Death manipulates Saint Germain to resurrect Dracula via an alchemical process as a Rebis containing the souls of both Vlad and Lisa Tepes. With the two souls in one body driving Dracula insane, Death plans to feast on the mass of murder that will result. He is defeated in a fight with Trevor Belmont, who uses a magical knife capable of killing divine entities.

Simon Belmont

 is the first protagonist to appear in the series. He has appeared in Castlevania, Vampire Killer, Haunted Castle, Castlevania II: Simon's Quest, Super Castlevania IV, Castlevania Chronicles, Castlevania Judgment, and Castlevania: Harmony of Despair.

Carmilla
 is a devoted worshiper of chaos and Dracula. Her name is a reference to the title character of the 1872 novel Carmilla, which predated Bram Stoker's Dracula by 25 years. Her first appearance was as an antagonist in Castlevania II: Simon's Quest. She later reappeared in Castlevania: Dracula X, and Castlevania: Circle of the Moon (non-canon), and Castlevania Judgment. Carmilla and her mask were available in the game as a boss.

Carmilla's appearances and names have differed. The Camilla spelling is also used in Circle of the Moon, while all other appearances favor the Carmilla spelling. Her initial appearance in Simon's Quest was interpreted as a mask that leaked tears of blood, while later appearances give her a humanoid form.

In Circle of the Moon, she successfully resurrected Dracula in her Austrian castle in 1830, although he hadn't regained his full power.  To restore it, they planned to sacrifice the vampire hunter Morris Baldwin, father to Hugh Baldwin and mentor to Nathan Graves, during a lunar eclipse of the full moon.  As Nathan began making headway in the effort to rescue his master, Carmilla brainwashed Hugh to do her bidding and challenged Nathan to a battle in the Underground Waterway.  Although she died, Carmilla relished the fact that the rite to restore Dracula's power was nearly finished.

In Rondo of Blood, Carmilla has a blue-haired companion called . Laura was the central protagonist and narrator from the original novel, Carmilla. She is a particularly vicious non-boss enemy in Portrait of Ruin, but is referred to as "Carmilla's eternal servant" in her bestiary entry. In the reboot Lords of Shadow, Laura is Carmilla's daughter, who challenges the main character Gabriel with dangerous games.

She is voiced by Karen Strassman in Judgment.

In the reboot Lords of Shadow, Carmilla is played by Sally Knyvette. She is one of the titular Lords, ruling over the vampires and is the second lord faced by the protagonist, Gabriel Belmont. She has a vampire "daughter" named Laura. Before sacrificing her soul to heaven, she was known to be a kind woman who loved all of Earth's creatures, and became the opposite as a Lord of Shadow. This is a marked departure from the description of her in life in the original novel. However, the explicit sexuality sometimes attributed to her (seen especially in Castlevania: Judgment) is a direct (albeit exaggerated) reference to her characterization in the novel. She appears again in the sequel, Castlevania: Lords of Shadow 2, albeit with a different appearance.

She appears in the Castlevania animated series, voiced by Jaime Murray, having a distinct disloyalty to Dracula as she considers him a madman whose genocidal vendetta against the humans is threatening their race. She tricks Hector into betraying Dracula, and takes him captive in the aftermath of Dracula's defeat. Carmilla then plans to claim the scattered territories between Wallachia and her home territory of Styria, a plan which hinges on having Hector forge Night Creatures to provide her with an army. While her co-ruler Lenore manages to coerce Hector's cooperation, Carmilla's ambitions ultimately do not proceed very far. Her other co-rulers Striga and Morana muse that ruling such a large swatch of land full of humans who will not submit to vampire rule is impractical, and Isaac manages to assault her castle shortly after Hector begins forging for her. She fights Isaac in a duel to the death, and kills herself rather than suffer defeat at his hands.

She appears in the 2018 crossover fighting game Super Smash Bros. Ultimate as a background character on the Dracula's Castle stage, based on her appearance in Simon's Quest. She cameos at the end of Simon and Richter's reveal trailer, frightening Luigi as his soul is about to re-enter his body.

Ferryman
The  is a character whose task is to carry people across dangerous rivers. He takes characters to "meet their destiny". He first appeared in Simon's Quest helping Simon reach Rover Mansion. He was later seen in Rondo of Blood (and its remake, The Dracula X Chronicles), Symphony of the Night and  Legacy of Darkness.

The Adventure and Belmont's Revenge

Christopher Belmont
 starred in three Castlevania games as a protagonist, two for the Game Boy system and one for the Wii. The two Game Boy games were Castlevania: The Adventure and Castlevania II: Belmont's Revenge. In the latter, Christopher has to rescue his son, Soleil Belmont, after he was kidnapped by Count Dracula. He appears in Nintendo Wii's Castlevania: The Adventure ReBirth. He also was the protagonist in the limited Castlevania: The Belmont Legacy comic book series released by IDW Publishing. Christopher was a pre-existing character in the Castlevania universe even before the games he starred in were released, as he is mentioned by name in the Japanese manual for the first Famicom Castlevania title, as the last Belmont to have defeated Dracula, a hundred years before Simon.

Soleil Belmont
 appears as a non-playable character in Castlevania II: Belmont's Revenge, which was released for the Game Boy in 1991.  He was called Soleiyu in the original release of Belmont's Revenge and was later correct to Soleil (French for sun) in the 1998 re-release of the game for the European market.

In 1591, Soleil, who recently celebrated his coming of age, was captured by Dracula's minions and bewitched to do the Count's evil bidding. With the youth's help, Dracula was able to take human form once again. Christopher Belmont, his father, ultimately rescued him.

Dracula's Curse and Curse of Darkness

Trevor Belmont

Trevor defeated Dracula in Castlevania III. This was accomplished with the aid of Grant Danasty, Sypha Belnades and Alucard. He would later marry Sypha Belnades and have children with her, adding the prodigious magical powers of the Belnades line to the Belmont line, which would be most prominently seen in Juste Belmont.

He later plays a secondary role in Curse of Darkness, where he is investigating the rise of Dracula in the region. He confronts the Devil Forgemaster Hector, and although he initially treats Hector with contempt, he aids him in his quest. After being injured by Isaac, Julia LaForeze gets to him in time, but he is unable to do anything for the remainder of the battle. Meanwhile, Hector succeeds in stopping Isaac and sending Dracula's castle back into the abyss, effectively lifting the curse placed three years prior. So, despite his nearly fatal defeat, Trevor's mission was accomplished. In the game, he is unlocked after beating the game with Hector.

He, along with Sypha Belnades and Grant Danasty, later makes a cameo appearance in Castlevania: Symphony of the Night when zombies impersonate the trio to antagonize Alucard. The same zombie impersonators also appear in Castlevania: Portrait of Ruin when Jonathan Morris and Charlotte Aulin trek the Nest of Evil.

By Simon Belmont's era (as shown in Castlevania: Judgment), Trevor Belmont is looked up to by his future descendants, along with his wife Sypha, his ally Alucard and his friend Grant, known as the "Greatest Three". This pushes Simon, who is trapped in the Time Rift, to seek them to prove his worthiness. According to the Bradygames Official Guide, Trevor is approximately 185 cm (6'1").

In the Lords of Shadow series, Trevor is the son of Gabriel and Marie Belmont. He makes his debut in Mirror of Fate where it is revealed that, under orders from Pan, who foresaw Gabriel's turn to darkness, Trevor's existence was kept secret from his father by the Brotherhood of Light, and he was not told of his parentage until adulthood. Shamed by his lineage, he ventured to Dracula's castle to defeat his father and avenge his mother, but falls to Dracula and is impaled by his own combat cross. The Mirror of Fate reveals the truth of his father's circumstances to Trevor, leading him to pity Dracula and reveal his identity as he dies. Horrified, Dracula attempts to revive Trevor by making him drink his blood but seemingly fails. Never knowing Trevor's true name, Dracula buries him within his castle in a coffin bearing the name "Alucard". Trevor reawakens thirty years later as a vampire, taking the name engraved on the coffin. He returns in the sequel Lords of Shadow 2 where he plays an important part in his father's journey of redemption.

In the animated adaptation, Trevor is the last of House Belmont; a noble house whose dedication in protecting the citizens of Wallachia led to the Church excommunicating them and evicting them from their ancestral lands (as they were accused of practicing black magic.) He first appears as a lazy drunkard, though eventually sobers to reveal his great skill in slaying monsters.

Trevor is voiced by Richard Madden in Mirror of Fate and Richard Armitage in the Castlevania animated series.

Grant Danasty
 is a character in Castlevania III and Castlevania: Judgment. A young pirate (listed as an acrobat in the ending sequence of the Castlevania III Japanese version) and skilled knife fighter whose ship was corrupted by Dracula's magic, he was transformed into a demon and took over a clock tower in Wallachia. When defeated by Trevor Belmont, he became human again and decided to travel with Trevor to Dracula's castle. After Dracula's defeat, he oversaw the restoration of the lands that had been affected by Dracula's evil. In Castlevania Judgement, it is revealed that he had loved Sypha and wanted to marry her. Because of this, he was jealous toward Trevor and chose not to go to their wedding. While rebuilding the nation, he ended up in a time rift and was challenged to fight several champions. He believed that the time rift would give him a chance to change history, allowing him to marry Sypha instead. But his encounters led to battle with both Sypha and Trevor. After defeating them, he learned to forgive his friend. After Grant was returned to his own time, he was later remembered not as the one who had helped defeat Dracula but as the man who had rebuilt Wallachia. Despite this, Simon Belmont is clearly shown to remember him as one of the "Greatest Three", forever linked to the Belmont Family as a dear friend of his ancestors and a strong warrior. His surname is likely a reference to the historical House of Dăneşti, who were persecuted by the historical Vlad III. Dracula is very similar to Vlad the Impaler in game, and is said to have killed Grant's family. This mirrors the real life Vlad Dracula who killed the whole Dăneşti Clan, who were the cousins of the family Vlad's grandfather usurped.

In the third season of the animated adaptation, the character is referenced by both Trevor Belmont and Saint Germain, said to have "a Horse-Drawn Sail-Boat on wheels and called themselves 'The Pirate of the Roads'". Writer Warren Ellis has confirmed this to be a nod to the character. In Season 4, Greta of Danesti (voiced by Marsha Thomason) is introduced as the head-woman of the village of Danesti and love interest of Alucard, whose name, role and goals bear resemblance to Grant.

Sypha Belnades
 appears in Castlevania III and Castlevania: Judgment. A priestess (although she introduces herself as a vampire hunter to Trevor in the Castlevania III Japanese version) and witch of the church who uses elemental magic in battle, Sypha hid her gender to become a vampire hunter. She fought for the church to destroy evil, though her sister witches were hunted down by the church. She went on a journey to confront and destroy Dracula. On her way to the battle, she ended up in the Time Rift and decided to take it upon herself to defeat those tainted by darkness, despite which side they were on. Upon the defeat of the Time Reaper, she was returned to her own era (Judgment). She continued her journey to destroy Dracula, but was defeated by his minion, the Cyclops, and imprisoned in stone. She was freed when Trevor Belmont killed the Cyclops and aided Trevor in his battle against Dracula. After Dracula's death, she and Trevor married, adding her magical aptitude to the Belmont bloodline.

In the manual included with the Japanese Dracula's Curse, it is stated that she lost her parents when she was young and was found wandering near a monastery in Wallachia. She was adopted by the monks there. Judgment elaborates that she belonged to a coven of witches who were executed as a result of Dracula's scheming. In the Judgment storyline, it is revealed that Grant actually carried a torch for her since their first meeting in Castlevania, but lacking the resolve to confess to her his feelings, he lets her slip into Trevor Belmont's arms. Despite this, Sypha is said to have missed her friend when he chose to refuse his invitation to her marriage, patching up their friendship only after Grant's return from the Rift. Despite this brief moment of confusion, Sypha, Grant and Trevor are known in Belmont history as The Greatest Three, friends and warriors supreme, an example to all her descendants to follow.

In Lords of Shadow – Mirror of Fate, Sypha Belmont, née Belnades, is the wife of Trevor and the mother of Simon. She tries to comfort Trevor when he learns of his parents' fate, and sees him off as he ventures forth to battle Dracula. Following Trevor's death, Dracula's forces are unleashed and she is attacked, telling Simon to escape as she is killed by one of Dracula's werewolves. Years later, her soul is found by Simon beneath Dracula's castle, though he is unaware of her identity, and she joins him to protect him on his quest.

In the animated adaptation, Sypha is a member of a group of nomad scholars known as the Speakers who are demonized by the Church as they are falsely accused causing the attacks conducted by Dracula's army. She seeks out the "sleeping soldier" that she hopes will stop Dracula's attack, only to be turned to stone by a cyclops before being saved by Trevor Belmont, who helps her find Alucard and release him from his prison. In the Belmont estate's repository of knowledge, she finds an incomplete spell meant to force Dracula's castle to appear in a given place and trap it there. Completing the spell, she successfully casts it which destroys the mechanisms that allow the castle to teleport, allowing the trio to confront Dracula. After Alucard drives a wooden stake through Dracula's heart and Trevor beheads him, Sypha burns what's left with her magic. Following Dracula's defeat, Sypha proposes to Trevor that they continue traveling together, fighting monsters and forming a romantic relationship. Finding themselves in the town of Lindenfeld, Sypha and Trevor ally themselves with Saint Germain to stop an attempt to resurrect Dracula. Sypha's enthusiasm for her lifestyle is soured by the events in Lindenfeld, which sees the entire town sacrificed in the efforts to revive Dracula. After weeks of chasing down vampires trying to resurrect Dracula, she complains that being around Trevor has made her more like him. She and Trevor find themselves in Targoviste and resolve to be more active in the events around them rather than reactive. Their battles in Targoviste lead them to a transmission mirror through which they follow Varney to arrive back at Dracula's Castle. They aid Alucard who is fending off an invasion and successfully stop Saint Germain and Death (who had disguised himself as Varney) from returning both Dracula and Lisa Tepes to life. After Trevor seemingly perishes defeating Death, Sypha realizes that she is pregnant and prepares to return to her Speaker caravan. Alucard convinces her to stay with the community that is making the grounds of the castle and the Belmont Hold its home, and immediately after, Trevor returns, to Sypha's equal joy and frustration.

She is voiced by Charlotte Emerson in Lords of Shadow – Mirror of Fate and Alejandra Reynoso in the Castlevania animated series.

Alucard

 is Dracula's only child, the half-vampire son of the count and a human woman named Lisa. He appears in Castlevania III, Aria of Sorrow, Dawn of Sorrow, Judgment & Legends, and stars in Symphony of the Night. A reference to the 1940s movie "Son of Dracula", Alucard is "Dracula" spelled backwards. This is a title Alucard seems to have adopted for himself, as his actual full name is Adrian Fahrenheit Ţepeş.

Alucard also appeared in Captain N: The Game Master voiced by Ian James Corlett.

Alucard appears in Mirror of Fate, the second game in the Lords of Shadow reboot series. It is revealed that this version of Alucard was originally Trevor Belmont, the son of Gabriel and Marie Belmont, before being turned into a vampire. Trevor grew up not knowing of his true origin until the Brotherhood of Light reveals to him who his parents were. Believing that Dracula murdered his mother in cold blood, he decides to pursue him, in the hopes of destroying him and bringing peace. During the fight, Trevor is defeated and stabbed with his Combat Cross. Dying and gazing at the Mirror of Fate, he finally realizes the truth of what really happened to Gabriel and feels sorry for him, calling him his father. Dracula, feeling confused, gazes at the mirror as well and learns who Trevor was all along. Remorseful for killing his own son who had been unknown to him the entire time, Dracula tries to bring him back to life by making him drink his blood, which seems to be in vain. Dracula mourns over his loss, and places Trevor in a coffin with the name Alucard, since he never learned his son's real name. Many years later, Alucard awakens, with pale white skin, white hair, and glowing orange eyes. He meets up with Dracula and his own son, Simon. Alucard tries to finish what he started, angry that his father turned him into a vampire. Dracula asks Alucard to join him in remaking the world and destroying the Brotherhood, but Alucard refuses. Dracula proceeds to attack Simon for being a Belmont, wishing to end the Belmont bloodline due to his hatred of his past life. Alucard and Simon manage to defeat Dracula, and part ways as Dracula's castle crumbles.

Alucard also appears as a supporting character in the sequel, Castlevania: Lords of Shadow 2, playing an important role in his father's journey of redemption. He is playable in the DLC Revelations taking place shortly prior to the events of the main game. In the Lords of Shadow series Alucard is voiced by Game of Thrones actor Richard Madden.

Alucard also appears in the Castlevania animated series voiced by James Callis. He opposes Dracula's mission to eradicate humanity, but loses their first confrontation, forcing him into slumber to heal his wounds. He is awakened by Trevor Belmont and Sypha Belnades, and after testing them in battle, joins them in a quest to stop Dracula.

Hector
 is the devil forgemaster and the main protagonist of Curse of Darkness. He betrayed Dracula and left for a normal life. He took back his devil forgemaster powers to defeat Isaac and once again bring peace back to the land. The player controls Hector in the normal play mode. He has silver hair and wields a war hammer or sword.

In the Castlevania animated series (voiced by Theo James) Hector is portrayed as a forgemaster for Dracula's castle, creating monsters from dead corpses. As a child, he was beaten and isolated for his penchant of resurrecting dead animals as pets. After burning down his house (parents included), he worked to perfect his craft in Necromancy, leading to his eventual recruitment into Dracula's Castle.

Isaac
 appears in Curse of Darkness and Akumajo Dracula Pachislot. He is Hector's villainous rival who stayed loyal to Dracula after Trevor defeated him a few years before the start of the game. The player will fight Isaac a few times over the course of the game.

In the Castlevania animated series, (voiced by Adetokumboh M'Cormack), Isaac is portrayed as a former African slave who was whipped regularly for small offenses. His suffering led to him developing a complete disdain for humanity, and he soon killed his master. Working as one of Dracula's generals and a devil forgemaster, his loyalty comes from Dracula treating him with far more respect than any other human.

Julia Laforeze
 is Isaac's sister and a witch. She provides items for the player in a shop. Hector notes she bears a resemblance to Rosaly, his deceased lover.

Saint Germain
 appears in Curse of Darkness and Akumajo Dracula Pachislot. 
In Castlevania (TV series), he is an alchemist seeking access to the multidimensional Infinite Corridor in which his beloved is trapped. In Season 3, he assists Trevor and Sypha with a demon-infested priory in exchange for access to the arcane knowledge of its library.  In Season 4, he sides with the forces of evil to attempt to resurrect Dracula via an alchemical Rebis, believing it will give him the ability to travel freely through the Infinite Corridor and rescue his beloved.  Eventually he realizes he has been deceived by Death and dies casting a spell that saves Trevor's life.

Angela
Angela is a magical dancing girl from the Akumajo Dracula Pachislot games. She aids Ralph C. Belmont on his quest to stop Dracula, who has prematurely risen again. She casts a spell that annihilates a horde of skeletons and during Ralph's battle with Dracula, she is able to use magic to resuscitate him to continue the battle.

Lenore

Lenore is one of the four members in the Council of Sisters in Castlevania animated series. She is in charge of watching over their slave Hector and convincing him to forge them an army. Going against Carmilla, Lenore then gives Hector clothes and moves him to a candle-lit cell with a desk and a blanket. Over time, Hector falls for Lenore's charms. She tricks Hector by slipping a magic ring onto his finger as they are having sex, which enslaves him. Lenore presents the council with rings she had forged to make Hector's night creatures loyal to them. The ring will also instantly kill Hector if he attempts to run away from them. She is voiced by Jessica Brown Findlay.

Sumi and Taka

In the Castlevania animated series, Sumi and Taka are Japanese vampire hunters who travel to Transylvania to be trained by Alucard. They were once enslaved by a vampire named Chō, who actually enlisted into Dracula's army, but was killed by Sypha in the previous season finale. Alucard originally suspected they were thieves but began to bond with them, going as far as showing them the Belmont Hold. While he was in his bed one night, they entered his room and proceeded to have sex with him, but they then suddenly restrain Alucard by using a trap. Taka and Sumi accuse Alucard of withholding his knowledge of magic from them and not teaching them how to operate the castle. Before they can stake him, he uses his sword to slit their throats. Following their betrayal, Alucard is later seen prostrate and weeping on the floor. The series ends with Alucard at the castle's entrance, where he has left the impaled bodies of Sumi and Taka as a warning to future visitors. Sumi is voiced by Rila Fukushima and Taka is voiced by Toru Uchikado.

Kid Dracula

Kid Dracula is a lighthearted spinoff of the Castlevania series set sometime in the distant future. In Japan, the series is called Akumajō Dracula Special: Boku Dracula-kun. Though elements from the series have been referenced throughout the main Castlevania series, the series has not been listed on any timeline published by Konami.

Kid Dracula
Kid Dracula is a 10,009 year old being and the lord of Castlevania. He had to retake the castle from Galamoth to return to his throne. In the Game Boy sequel, Kid Dracula defeated Galamoth a second time after the being attempted to capture the castle again. Throughout the series, Kid Dracula makes references to his "father", hinting at him to be an alternative version of Alucard.

In Super Smash Bros. Ultimate, Kid Dracula's shadow can sometimes be seen in the background of the Dracula's Castle stage, and he can also be obtained as a collectible Spirit.

Galamoth
 (aka Garamoth) is the Lord of Space. He is originally from the Kid Dracula series. Sometime in the distant future, Galamoth tried to take over the Dracula's Castle to become the new Demonlord, but was defeated by Kid Dracula (Kid Dracula Famicom/Mobile phones). He tried to retake the castle again, but was defeated a second time (Kid Dracula GB). Galamoth later appeared as an optional boss in Symphony of the Night, located in the Floating Catacombs. Galamoth appeared in Aria of Sorrow as a soul that allowed Soma Cruz to see past areas blocked by time.

He is referred to by name in Castlevania Judgment when the Time Reaper is defeated. He is implied to be the one who sent the Time Reaper back 10,000 years into the past destroy Dracula and erase his reign from the timeline.

Rondo of Blood and Symphony of the Night

Richter Belmont

 has starred as a protagonist in Castlevania: Rondo of Blood (and its remakes), Symphony of the Night, and Akumajō Dracula: The Medal (an arcade medallion slot game). His first appearance is the main character in Castlevania: Rondo of Blood.  In Symphony of the Night, a direct sequel which takes place five years later, he became a brainwashed primary antagonist; however, completing the game unlocks an option to play the entire game as Richter. However, there is an alternate ending to Symphony of the Night that suggests that he was the cause of Dracula's return. He is also playable in an extra mode in Castlevania: Portrait of Ruin.

Hero of the Castlevania: Dracula X games and a major character in Castlevania: Symphony of the Night, Richter had to battle legions of Dracula's monsters to save his love interest Annette. In Symphony of the Night, Richter mysteriously disappears upon investigating Dracula's recently reconstructed castle. It is later revealed that he was brainwashed by Shaft, a dark priest and servant of Dracula. Players will end up facing Richter: physically defeating him will result in the game ending early, whereas freeing him from Shaft's control will continue the game.

In his first two appearances, as well as the prologue for the third, Richter wears a headband and a blue uniform. In Symphony of the Night, only in the Saturn version following the prologue, his hair is noticeably longer and his attire appears more regal, matching Ayami Kojima's redesign of the character (the PlayStation version reuses the Rondo of Blood sprites). He also gains a few new abilities, notably a dash, a slide attack, and a super jump that doubles as an uppercut.

In Portrait of Ruin, Jonathan Morris fights a recreation of Richter (called "Whip's Memory") in a test created by Stella and Loretta Lecarde to unlock the Vampire Killer's full power, as he is the last known Belmont to wield the whip before Julius Belmont killed Dracula in 1999. Richter also appears in the game as one of the Five Greatest. Richter appears in the 2018 crossover fighting game Super Smash Bros. Ultimate as a playable character alongside his ancestor Simon, to whom he has a similar set of moves, being labelled as an "echo fighter". Richter will appear as a main character of the Castlevania: Nocturne animated series, currently in production at Netflix, which will be set during the French Revolution. Dead Cells: Return to Castlevania features Richer Belmont as a playable character.

Richter is voiced in English by Ramsay Scott McCulloch in Castlevania: Symphony of the Night and David Vincent in its PSP version, the PSP remake of Rondo of Blood, Castlevania: The Dracula X Chronicles, and Super Smash Bros. Ultimate he is also voiced by Bérenger Dupré in Dead Cells: Return to Castlevania.

Maria Renard

 is a local village girl with the power to control the Four Symbols (China) of Chinese mythology. She appears in the PC Engine video game Akumajō Dracula X: Rondo of Blood (and its remakes Dracula X Chronicles for PSP and Castlevania Dracula X for Super NES), as well as in Symphony of the Night, Castlevania Judgment, and Akumajō Dracula: The Medal. She is a distant blood relative of the Belmont clan (no mention of that connection is to be found in Castlevania: The Dracula X Chronicles, where she is instead said to be the daughter of a local lord). In the Super NES version of Castlevania: Dracula X, she's also said to be the sister of Richter's beloved Annette, a detail that's not alluded to in the other games. She was later adopted by the Belmont family in Castlevania Judgment.

In 1792, Maria's parents were killed, and she was captured, along with several other young women, and taken to Dracula's castle. Richter Belmont saved Maria from Shaft, one of Dracula's servants, who was attempting to cast a spell on her. Once Maria is rescued, she becomes playable and uses various magically enhanced animal attacks for combat. There exists an ending in which, instead of Richter doing it, Maria confronts and defeats the Count. In the introduction sequence to Symphony of the Night (a retelling of the final boss battle in Rondo of Blood), if Richter's health completely runs out, a 12-year-old Maria will appear and amplify Richter with her magic in his effort to defeat Dracula. Judgment further explains that she fought alongside Richter in defeating Dracula and has power that rivals the Belmonts. Unlike Annette, if you fail to save her in Rondo of Blood, you will not face her at the end.

Four years after the defeat of Dracula, Richter vanished. Maria immediately set out to find him. After a year of searching, in 1797, she finally found Castlevania. In the castle she learned that Richter was working in concert with the dark forces.  With Maria's help, the half-vampire Alucard was able to break Shaft's hold on Richter and defeat Dracula. Depending on certain player actions in Symphony, the player will receive different endings. In one, Maria will admit to not being able to live without Alucard and go after him. In another, she will resign herself due to the fact that she cannot ease his torment and returns home with Richter.

Maria also appears in Judgment, with a more bratty personality. She constantly trips and miscalculates her powerful magics, for comedic effect, and she acts mostly unaware of the Time Rift's nature, for example believing that Simon and Trevor merely stole the Vampire Killer from her friend Richter. She is also seemingly obsessed with her young age and diminutive body, going so far to openly complain against Carmilla and Shanoa for their developed bodies, and claim that Sypha's large breasts are a "gift from God", lashing out to her for suggesting that her beauty may pose a liability in combat.

Shaft
 is a dark priest that appears as the secondary antagonist of Akumajō Dracula X Chi no Rondo and Castlevania: Symphony of the Night. In 1792, Shaft aids Dracula in his plans to kidnap several young women. He is defeated by Richter after conjuring several monsters in an attempt to defeat him. Later in the game, Shaft's ghost makes a final attempt to stop the hero.

In 1797, Dracula's monsters kidnap Richter and brainwash him. Shaft is instrumental in using his evil powers to control Richter, turning him against anyone who seeks to defy Dracula. Maria guesses that he is under their influence and helps Alucard to see past Shaft's deception. Alucard is able to save Richter instead of killing him, and goes on to defeat Shaft, although not before Shaft successfully revives Dracula just before being stopped for good.

Annette
 is Richter's fiancée.  In Castlevania: Rondo of Blood—and also Dracula X for the SNES and Dracula X Chronicles for the PSP—she was kidnapped by Dracula's minions, along with Maria, Iris, and Terra. Failing to save her will result in having to face her in Dracula X and The Dracula X Chronicles, where she is turned into a vampire who takes Death's and Shaft's ghost's respective places as the boss. In the English localization of the SNES game Castlevania: Dracula X, her name was spelled as "Anett" during the game's intro storyline. Depicted as a purple haired young girl in her original Rondo of Blood design, she was redesigned as a blonde in the same way as Maria, and wearing more aristocratic attire in Dracula X for the SNES and in Chronicles for the PSP.

Iris and Tera
They were kidnapped by Dracula's minions to taunt Richter, along with Annette and Maria. Tera sees Richter as a warrior of God and Maria as angel sent by Heaven, thanking them both for saving her. Iris, being a doctor's daughter, helps heal the wounds of the duo when they rescue her as a show of thanks.

Lisa
 is Alucard's mother and Dracula's second wife, seeing past her husband's personality to see the lonely man he truly is. She was executed on the charge of witchcraft after healing villagers with penicillin, spurring Dracula's genocidal vendetta against humanity. Alucard witnessed her death and promised her not to hate humans and tells Dracula she will love him for eternity, which Alucard relays in Symphony of the Night.

In the animated adaptation, her story remains the same with the exception that she was accused of witchcraft because she reverse engineered the more advanced technology Dracula possessed to improve the lives of the Wallachian people which the church condemned as the devil's work.

She is voiced by Emily Swallow in the Castlevania animated series.

Golem
Golem is a recurring character found throughout the Castlevania series. His first appearance was in Rondo of Blood. Golem was originally created by Carmilla to be a mindless guard of ancient ruins. When he was pulled into the time rift by Aeon, the rift gives him self-awareness. He fought the champions to become human, and discover the meaning of his existence. He lost his self-awareness, after being returned to his own time frame (Castlevania Judgment). IGA says he is based on Golem-type monsters, like the Franken, from Castlevania I.

Master Librarian
The  is the loyal servant of Dracula in charge of the knowledge of the library. He will sell items to young master Alucard for a price.

Succubus
In Symphony of the Night, a  assumed the guise of Lisa at the time of her death to tempt Alucard into turning on the humans, only to be killed upon him learning her true identity. Succubus, or a member of her race, appears in Lament of Innocence and Akumajo Dracula Pachislot.

Legends

Castlevania Legends and Sonia Belmont were rendered non-canonical when the game was redacted from IGA's series timeline due to inconsistencies.

Sonia Belmont
 is the protagonist of Castlevania Legends. At the age of seventeen she lived in a remote part of Transylvania.  She was born with special abilities that allowed her to sense the presence of physical and spiritual beings, and was taught how to use a whip by her grandfather.  It is not explicitly stated whether the whip she uses is the Vampire Killer or not.

Within the castle, she encounters Alucard, the half-vampire son of Dracula. She had met him some time before and it can be inferred from their dialogue that the two had formed a romantic relationship. Alucard was intent on dissuading Sonia from her goal, planning to stop his father alone. When Sonia would not yield, he challenged her to a battle to test her abilities. After she defeated him, Alucard was confident that Sonia could overcome Dracula and he went into a self-imposed sleep. Sonia defeated Dracula, and spared Europe from his evil influence for a time. Sometime after Dracula's defeat, Sonia bore a child who "would carry on the fate and tragedy of the Belmont family, and the bloodline of dark ways." The child would grow up to fight Dracula again and become a hero.

Sonia was one of the confirmed leads in the Dreamcast game Castlevania: Resurrection, up until that game's cancellation.

Bloodlines and Portrait of Ruin

John Morris

He is a descendant of the Belmont family, and wields the Vampire Killer whip, much like his ancestors. John died some time after the events of Bloodlines, as it was revealed his wounds wouldn't heal. This was caused by his using the Vampire Killer whip, which would sap the strength of someone that was not a full-blooded descendant of the Belmont lineage, but by the time John learned this, it was too late.

Bloodlines is deeply intertwined with the storyline of Bram Stoker's Dracula.  As such, the father of John Morris is Quincy Morris, a character from the novel. It is only known that the Morrises are somehow of Belmont lineage. In the novel, Quincy stabs Dracula at the cost of his life, while Harker cuts off Dracula's head. However, that fact he managed to unknowingly deal a crippling blow to Dracula may have been the foundation for his part in the Castlevania version of these events.

Eric Lecarde
 appears in Bloodlines, Portrait of Ruin, and Judgment. Born on May 3, 1892 in Segovia, Spain, he uses the Alucard Spear (mistranslated as "Alcarde Spear" in Bloodlines). The spear was created by Alucard to complement the power of the Vampire Killer, and fight alongside the Morris line. When Elizabeth Bartley attempted to revive Dracula, Eric volunteered to fight alongside his friend John Morris in the hunt. However, he had not told John the real reason behind his appetite for vengeance: the Countess turned the love of his life, Gwendolyn, into a vampire.

Years later, Eric set out towards Dracula's Castle to investigate its reappearance, but was slain by the vampire Brauner. Unbeknownst to him, Eric's daughters had followed him into the castle and bore witness to his death, but both were then bitten by Brauner and turned into vampires. Unable to cross into the afterlife, Eric's ghost remained in the castle and was later met by Jonathan Morris and Charlotte Aulin. Initially calling himself "Wind", Eric tested the pair's abilities with various side-quests. After being confronted by Jonathan following a skirmish with Stella, in which a locket holding a photo of him and his daughters was recovered, Eric disclosed his true identity and the full story behind himself, his daughters, and Jonathan's father. Once his daughters are rescued and Brauner and Dracula are both destroyed, Eric appears before his friends and family and gives them one last heartfelt moment together before crossing over into the afterlife.

In Judgment, Eric believed that the spear's potential was greater than the whip, and sought to prove that. While training he found himself in a time rift, having been brought there by Aeon. Eric believed the rift would give him a chance to prove the spear's potential against the Vampire Killer. After the defeat of Galamoth he was returned to his own time (Judgment).

Elizabeth Bartley
According to the game's story,  is Dracula's niece, raised back from the dead by her servant . She triggered the start of World War I by assassinating the Crown Prince of Austria, then gathered the souls of those who died in the war to revive Dracula. In the final stage, she initially fights John and Eric in the form of a Medusa, then attacks with elemental spells before ultimately being killed.

She is based on the actual Countess Erzsébet Báthory, and was likely intended to be her, as Báthory's first name is commonly anglicized to "Elizabeth", and the name "Bartley" likely being a mistranslation.

Drolta Tzuentes

Drolta Tzuentes is subservient witch of Elizabeth Bartley (the American Castlevania: Bloodlines instruction book gives contradictory information, saying that she is an "amateur witch" who "casts a spell which inadvertently brings Elizabeth Bartley back to life"), who resurrects her master. Drolta then accompanies Elizabeth in their plot to resurrect Count Dracula.

Drolta Tzuentes is based on Dorottya Szentes (Dorottya Semtész) who is one of the servants of Erzsébet Báthory (the historical version of Elizabeth Bartley) who, along with 2 others, are said to have been tried, convicted, and executed as accomplices to the crimes done by the noblewoman.

Jonathan Morris
 is a member of the Morris family of vampire hunters and appears in Castlevania: Portrait of Ruin. The wielder of the Vampire Killer in 1944, Jonathan received basic training from his father John Morris as a child. He tends to be a reckless youth, a trait which makes his childhood friend Charlotte Aulin worry about his well-being much of the time. He can, however, be very observant. After his father died, Jonathan grew to resent him, though neither he nor Charlotte knew that the soul-sapping effects of a non-Belmont using the Vampire Killer in battle resulted in his death.

After learning the truth about his father and the Vampire Killer from Eric, Jonathan gained a newfound respect for his father. Jonathan may then choose whether or not to battle the whip's memory of Richter Belmont, who was the last Belmont to wield the whip. and successfully unleash the full power of the Vampire Killer. He knows full well that he may perish from using it, though it is up to the player to decide whether to engage this optional encounter, and the canonical choice is unknown. Regardless, Jonathan and Charlotte traveled to the top of Dracula's Castle, and battled the combined forces of Count Dracula and Death, which had not previously occurred before according to Charlotte. When Dracula was vanquished, his castle was destroyed and Jonathan and the others escaped unscathed.

Charlotte Aulin
 is a magic user said to be descended from the Belnades clan. She shows strong potential as a sorceress. Along with Jonathan, she ventures into the castle to destroy Dracula. She is a smart girl who relies on enchanted books for information, to cast spells, and to summon weapons for close-range attacks. She also tends to be a nosy and talkative person, which is how she found out about Jonathan and the Vampire Killer, something which, according to Jonathan, she was supposed to keep secret. Charlotte is concerned about Jonathan's ability to wield the whip and assists him with the best she can, but she hates getting treated as (or even being called) a child. She tends to take things rationally and logically, which makes her seem unemotional but she is in fact a caring and compassionate young woman.

Brauner
 is a famous painter who forsook his humanity after losing his daughters during World War I. Now a vampire, he screams for vengeance upon humanity for their deaths.

When Dracula's Castle first appeared, Brauner used his special paintings to keep Dracula sealed so that he could keep the dark lord's power all for himself. Eric Lecarde set off to investigate the castle, but was ambushed by Brauner and slain. At the same time, Eric's daughters Stella and Loretta arrived to bear witness to their father's death, and Brauner bit both girls so as to turn them into his new vampiric "daughters".

When Jonathan and Charlotte finally confront Brauner, he flies into a rage over having lost his "daughters" again and attacks the pair. As he is defeated, Brauner explains the reasons for his actions, but is then slain by Death in order to revive Dracula.

Stella and Loretta
The vampire Brauner believe the two of them to be the reincarnations of his deceased daughters, having turned them to vampires and subjected them to a spell that causes their past lives to take control of them.

Brauner's "daughters" initially prevent Jonathan and Charlotte from investigating the castle. After a short fight with Stella, the two learn of the sisters' true identities when they find a locket containing a picture with both girls and Eric Lecarde, prompting Eric's ghost to reveal what happened to his daughters. The four of them later confront each other in the highest areas of the castle. While it is possible to kill the sisters (triggering a bad ending), Jonathan and Charlotte must use the "Sanctuary" spell to restore Stella and Loretta to their true selves. Their minds and humanity restored, the sisters open a door that leads to Brauner's studio and also offer Jonathan a way to unlock the true power of the Vampire Killer.

Upon defeating Dracula, Jonathan, Charlotte, Stella, and Loretta escape the castle, where Eric appears before them and tells his daughters to not burden themselves over their actions and move. Eric passes to the other side, leaving Stella and Loretta in tears, but they soon recover and thank Jonathan and Charlotte.

Stella and Loretta are playable in "Sisters Mode", which takes place before the main game and chronicles their search for their missing father. Unlike Jonathan and Charlotte, the player use the stylus to attack and the D-Pad to move them around, as they can also fly. As Stella, the player attacks enemies by slicing enemies with the stylus, and as Loretta, the player points at enemies to shoot a beam of ice.

Vincent Dorin
 is a priest that serves as the game merchant. Jonathan and Charlotte meet him in front of the castle and then near the entrance. Vincent is a rather greedy person, even if he explains that it is for the church. He also get bitten during the game and begs the two heroes to cure him (the player can choose to cure him or not, and while it affects the ending, it is not something noticeable). Even when cured, he isn't as much in debt concerning his merchandise.

His name was reused for an abbot in the reboot, Lords of Shadow. He went insane by isolating himself and protecting a priceless artifact, while his townspeople were being slaughtered by supernatural creatures.

Castlevania (Nintendo 64) and Legacy of Darkness

IGA claimed in 2006 that Castlevania and Legacy of Darkness for the Nintendo 64 were considered side projects to his timeline. However, the games were later listed on the 20th Anniversary Timeline, without any description. IGA later clarified that he looks at the titles as "...a Castlevania "gaiden" (subseries)" and complemented them by stating "...they both have a really unique take on the Castlevania world."  Iga later included Cornell in Castlevania Judgment (Nov 2008) (drawn from his era of the timeline by magical forces). The game and manual makes references to Legacy of Darkness story. Events and characters related to the game such as Ada are mentioned during Cornell's mission and by some of the characters who encounter Cornell during their missions (such as Death & Camilla). Legacy of Darkness is said to be Cornell's previous appearance in the manual.

Reinhardt Schneider
Though the Belmont surname may no longer follow , the blood inside of his veins remains the same, and his destiny is no different. He is the son of Michael Gelhart Schneider. Villagers have been found mutilated and drained of blood near Dracula's castle, and Reinhardt has to stop it.  He carries the typical Vampire Killer whip but can also wield a shortsword for close-range combat for which the whip may prove unsuitable; although the surname "Schneider" usually carries the same connotation as does the English surname "Tailor," its literal translation from German is the more general "one who cuts."

He is voiced by Andrew Hanikson.

Carrie Fernández
 is a magic-wielding girl descended from the Belnades clan. She was estranged from the populace of Wallachia for her affinity with magic, her mother dying to protect her from an angry mob. She turned her back on others, but when she learned that Dracula had once again risen, she took it upon herself to use her powers to stop him. She is Camilla Fernández's cousin, who is also captured by a vampire and turned into one.

She is voiced by Bianca Allen.

Actrise
 is a Dracula's witch servant, she sacrificed her own child to become immortal. She plays an antagonist role in Carrie's quest, offering her a chance to join Dracula, in which Carrie refuses. In the Castle Center, Actrise sics a Fernández warrior, who became a vampire, on Carrie in an attempt to stop her from reaching Dracula. After Carrie defeats her cousin, she and Actrise do battle on top of one of the castle towers, in which Actrise is overwhelmed and killed by Carrie. She also appears in Cornell's quest and taunts him, and is revealed to be responsible for turning Henry's father into a vampire.

Rosa
 is a woman who was recently turned into a vampire. She meets Reinhardt and Carrie in the Villa, watering flowers with blood. She plays a major role in Reinhardt's quest. She is seen next attempting to kill herself, walking into sunlight. Reinhardt stops her. She is then encountered with Death in the Castle Center in which she and Reinhardt do battle. She is defeated by him but is spared before Death takes her away. When Death ambushes Reinhardt, Rosa sacrifices herself by throwing herself into the path of Death's scythes. Rosa is comforted by Reinhardt as she dies, and then Death is defeated by a vengeful Reinhardt. In the end, after Dracula's defeat, Rosa is seen restored into human form and she and Reinhardt look upon Dracula's sunken castle.

Gilles de Rais
 is one of Dracula's servants. He used Cornell's power to reincarnate his master in the body of Malus. He later disguises himself as Dracula in preparation for his lord's eventual resurrection and kidnapped children to offer them as sacrifice and thus resurrect his master. He is later defeated by Reinhardt and Carrie in Dracula's throne room, where it is revealed he was an imposter.
He is probably based on the historical person of the same name.

Renon
 is a demonic salesman who appears intermittently throughout the game. He claims that "one needs gold even in Hell these days", and will gladly sell the player various power-ups such as spells and potions. Renon can be summoned by picking up a contract scroll that appears in various levels. The scroll then turns into an open briefcase. If the player spends more than 30,000 gold pieces before encountering Dracula, Renon transforms into his demon form and attempts to claim your soul for Hell.

Charles Vincent
 is a vampire hunter. His mannerisms seem to indicate that he is very intelligent, but lacks real experience with vampires or other evils. Charles plays a key role in the game.

If the player takes less time in reaching the Castle Keep and defeats Dracula for the first time, he changes back into Malus, but Charles douses him with holy water, before Dracula warps the player to an alternate dimension for the final battle. After Dracula's defeat, Charles' fate is unknown.

However, if the player takes more time in reaching the Castle Keep, Charles will arrive before them. He will fail in his attempt to subdue Dracula, and will be turned into a vampire instead. The player will be forced to fight and kill Charles. If this happens, then the heroes will not see through Dracula's illusions and ultimately fail in their quest.

Cornell
, also known as "Blue Crescent Moon", is a werewolf seen in both Castlevania: Legacy of Darkness and Castlevania Judgment. He is a member of a warrior clan cursed to turn into beastmen. He is the only member of his clan who had the ability to control his change. He was the only one of his brethren who refused to join the forces of Dracula. He honed his skills in the hopes of finding a cure for his clan and to protect his sister Ada. One day while out training he found himself unable to control his powers and was stuck in beast form (Castlevania Judgement). He encountered Aeon, a time traveler, who told him he had entered a time rift. Aeon challenged him, and told him the time rift would let him learn more about the nature of the curse. After encountering several champions from different eras, he learns from Camilla and Death that they still need him, and is told that there is a possibility of a cure for him (though he doesn't trust them). After the defeat of the Time Reaper, Cornell was returned to his own era, 1844. He returned to find his village in flame, and his sister Ada kidnapped. He then journeyed after the kidnappers to save his sister. He discovered that Dracula's castle had risen again, and that his fellow man-beast Ortega had kidnapped his sister. During his battles he saves the young Henry Oldrey, and later defeats Ortega. He learned from Ortega, that Death, Gilles De Rais, and Actrise had plotted the kidnapping of Ada to empower a newly raised Dracula. Dracula later reveals to the audience that his sister is not a blood relative. Cornell fights Dracula to save her causing Dracula to be pulled into a vortex of energy. Dracula traps Cornell with his last power and tries to take Ada with him. The beast within Cornell freed itself from his body and saves Ada, but is captured and pulled into the vortex by Dracula. Cornell had become fully human, and was able to live the rest of a normal life with Ada (Legacy of Darkness).

According to IGA, "I believe many people did not expect to see Cornell. I really wanted to include a beast man type character, so I picked him."

He is voiced by John Nuzzo (Legacy of Darkness).

A new version of Cornell appears in Lords of Shadow, voiced by Richard Ridings. He is the Dark Lord of the Lycans and the first Lords of Shadow that Gabriel encounters.

Ortega
 grew up in the same village as Cornell, a fellow man-beast, being a friend of his, but also a rival. The rivalry caused Ortega an increasing amount of frustration, as he was constantly being outdone on every occasion, and he started searching for a way to gain the kind of powers that would make him stronger than even Cornell.

This search led him on the path of darkness, as the only one able to grant him the request proved to be Dracula. As a condition for gaining the new powers, Dracula demanded of Ortega to aid his demons on their mission to kidnap Cornell's sister Ada and destroy the village. He was also to stop Cornell from rescuing Ada. Ortega accepted these conditions, and thus sealed his pact with the devil, gaining amazing power, but losing his humanity.

Ortega eventually fights Cornell as a Chimera on top one of the castle towers, but is defeated by him. Ortega accepts his defeat, but with his powers becoming out of control, he leaps off the castle tower to his death.

Henry Oldrey
 is the son of Mary and J. A. Oldrey. He was rescued by Cornell. Years later he became a knight of the church. He helped rescue the children kidnapped by Gilles de Rais.

Circle of the Moon

IGA claimed in 2006 that Circle of the Moon was considered a side project to his timeline. Elements from the game were mentioned in the English Xtreme Desktop Timeline, but the game itself was not included on the timeline. The English language timeline, distributed with preordered versions of Castlevania: Portrait of Ruin in North America by Konami of America, includes the date for Circle of the Moon though the events are not described. Circle of the Moon continues to occupy an ambiguous place in the timelines published by Konami of Japan, Konami of America, and various gaming publications.

Nathan Graves
 is the protagonist of Circle of the Moon. Nathan's parents were friends of his teacher, Morris Baldwin. Ten years before the events in Circle of the Moon, Nathan's parents banished Dracula, at the cost of their lives. Morris managed to survive, and took Nathan as a student. Nathan was trained alongside Morris' son, Hugh, to become a vampire killer. Nathan has been chosen by Morris to be the successor of the Hunter Whip.

Hugh Baldwin
 is the son of Morris and Nathan's rival. Hugh envies Nathan for being chosen by his father for possession of the Hunter Whip. However, Nathan does not reciprocate his hate, and often tries to reason with him. Dracula takes advantage of Hugh's discontent and entices him to kill Nathan near the end of the game. After being defeated, Hugh comes back to his senses and feels a new-found respect for Nathan and his father's decision to give Nathan the Hunter Whip.

Morris Baldwin
 is Hugh's father and a veteran Vampire Hunter. He and Nathan's parents sealed Count Dracula in 1820, ten years before the events in Circle of the Moon. Morris chose Nathan as his successor instead of his son, Hugh, because he suspected that his son only wanted the whip for the glory of inheriting the family heirloom. Though the game was not listed, Morris Baldwin was mentioned in the English Xtreme Desktop Timeline.

Harmony of Dissonance

Juste Belmont
 is the primary protagonist in Castlevania: Harmony of Dissonance. In 1748, he entered Dracula's castle with his ally Maxim Kischine to locate the remaining relics of Dracula and save his friend Lydie Erlanger. He wears his bracelet, as does Maxim his own, and carries the "Vampire Killer" whip. Juste is an exceptional spell caster due to the Belnades blood running through his veins, and his abilities are considered prodigious among his fellow family members. Juste received the Vampire Killer when he was only 16.

Juste appears in Portrait of Ruin when using the "Greatest Five" attack.

Richter Belmont could be the son or grandson of Juste Belmont.

Maxim Kischine
 is a childhood friend and rival of Juste, and the wielder of the Stellar Sword. He is responsible for unwillingly triggering the events that take place in 1748, during Harmony of Dissonance, by wishing to relieve Juste of his fate and become more powerful than he is. Inspired by the tale of Simon Belmont, Maxim gathered the cursed remains of Count Dracula so he could destroy them, and in doing so created an evil Maxim in his soul that hungered for power and destruction like Dracula did.

In the best ending, Juste helps Maxim overcome his dark influence by wearing their bracelets as a reminder of their friendship. Though not at full power, the evil Maxim takes Dracula's remains (gathered by Juste during his quest) and turns into a ghostly incarnation of Dracula (Dracula Wraith), then into a giant creature made of the body parts before finally being slain. Maxim is restored to normal afterwards.

Maxim is playable in a secret gameplay mode of Harmony of Dissonance. His Stellar Sword is also an obtainable weapon in Portrait of Ruin. When wielding it, Jonathan can summon multiple illusions of himself to attack all on-screen enemies, similar to Maxim's own abilities.

Lydie Erlanger
 is a childhood friend to both Juste and Maxim, and a person whom they deeply care about. Her presence is comforting to the young men, who underwent strict physical training. She was first kidnapped by Maxim's dark side and held within Dracula's castle, then kidnapped by Death so that the evil Maxim could take her blood and be properly resurrected as Dracula. After the Dracula Wraith is slain, her bite wounds are healed.

Merchant
A shopkeeper character in Harmony of Dissonance. All that is known about him is that he stumbled into Dracula's castle during his travels and, being unable to escape, set up shops through the castle. Many of his shops can only be accessed when Juste meets certain status conditions, such as having an even number of Hearts or when possessing a rare item.

Aria of Sorrow and Dawn of Sorrow

Soma Cruz

His Japanese voice actor in all games is Hikaru Midorikawa, and his English voice actor in Harmony of Despair is Eric Davies. Soma's presence in two Castlevania games, unusual for most Castlevania characters, was made by producer Koji Igarashi, who noted that one of the reasons he made Dawn of Sorrow was to utilize Soma Cruz in another game.

In both games' international versions, he is depicted as a transfer student studying in Japan (or simply as a Japanese high school student, in the Japanese version), living a peaceful life with his childhood friend Mina Hakuba. During the events of Aria of Sorrow, Soma awakens in Dracula's castle, where he learns of his "power of dominance," which enables him to absorb the souls of monsters and use their powers. He ventures through Dracula's castle, learning that Dracula had been destroyed years prior, and his reincarnation was coming to the castle that day. Defeating Graham Jones, who had harbored the notion that he was Dracula's reincarnation, causes Soma to realize that he is Dracula's reincarnation. With the aid of his friends, he is able to escape his fate by defeating the manifestation of the castle's chaos. In Dawn of Sorrow, Soma returns into battle to combat Celia Fortner's cult, which seeks to kill Soma and revive the dark lord. Soma manages to defeat them, and realizes at the end of the game that he is free to determine his own destiny rather than inevitably become another Dracula.

Mina Hakuba
 is the childhood friend of Soma Cruz and the only daughter of the priest of the Hakuba shrine. Her attire in Aria of Sorrow reflects this, as her attire is that of a traditional miko. She is transported into Dracula's castle alongside Soma at the start of Aria of Sorrow and remains outside the castle for the duration of the game, offering Soma advice that she acquires from Arikado. When Soma realizes that he is Dracula's reincarnation, Mina is able to accept him for who he is, and offers him moral support. After Soma escapes his fate, Mina returns to the Hakuba shrine with him. In Dawn of Sorrow, Mina is briefly present in the game, present solely in the opening and ending sequences. In the beginning of Dawn of Sorrow, she and Soma are nearly killed by Celia Fortner, who is repelled by Soma and Arikado. Mina spends the remainder protected by Arikado's subordinates, but sends a letter and talisman to Soma during the course of the game. A doppelgänger of her also appears in a later stage in the game. When confronted by Soma, Celia fakes killing the doppelgänger in front of him, prompting a furious Soma to begin to transform into the dark lord. The talisman she sends him however, delays the transformation enough for Genya to reveal the truth to Soma, halting his transformation. At the end of the game, she and Soma share a tender moment, to the amusement of their onlooking friends. Given the striking similarity, Mina's name seems to have been inspired by Mina Harker from the original Bram Stoker works.

Julius Belmont
 is the latest member of the Belmont clan featured in the Castlevania series.
Members of the Belmont clan have been the protagonists of most Castlevania games, and Julius' role as a supporting character is unusual for the series. His Japanese voice actor in both games is Tetsu Inada, and he is voiced by David Lodge in Castlevania: Harmony of Despair. In both Aria of Sorrow and Dawn of Sorrow, Julius is playable through "Julius Mode." While the "Julius Mode" in Aria of Sorrow solely features Julius, Yoko Belnades and Alucard can be unlocked as playable characters in the "Julius Mode" in Dawn of Sorrow. In Harmony of Despair he becomes a DLC character.

Prior to the event taking place in Aria of Sorrow, Julius is the last and only Belmont to permanently defeat Dracula in 1999 thus ending his rebirth cycle by sealing his source of power (Dracula's Castle) inside a solar eclipse. However Julius somehow became amnesiac and wandered the land until he arrived at Dracula's castle as the amnesiac "J," having forgotten his identity after defeating Dracula prior to the start of the game. He encounters Soma Cruz, and Soma's dark power awakens Julius' memories. Julius later confronts Soma after realizing that Soma is Dracula's reincarnation, and battles him. Julius, unwilling to pit his full power against Soma, is defeated. After Soma escapes his fate of becoming another dark lord, Julius sends his thanks. After the events in Aria of Sorrow, Julius works for the Roman Catholic Church as a paranormal investigator alongside Yoko Belnades. In Dawn of Sorrow, he travels to the base housing Celia Fortner's cult with Yoko. Julius later battles Dario Bossi, one of the "dark lord's candidates" and Celia's henchman, and is defeated. After Celia and Dmitrii Blinov, the last candidate, flee into the depths of the castle, Julius uses all his power to shatter the barrier guarding their flight. He is greatly weakened as a result, and does not participate in the final battle; although he appears during the final cutscene of the game.

Genya Arikado

 is a member of a Japanese government organization related to national security. In truth, he is Alucard, the son of Dracula, best known as the protagonist in Konami's highly acclaimed Castlevania: Symphony of the Night. During the events in Aria of Sorrow, he comes to Dracula's castle to ensure that a dark lord is not created. He instructs Soma Cruz to seek the throne room in Dracula's castle, hoping that Soma will absorb Dracula's powers. The gambit succeeds, and Soma nearly becomes the dark lord. However, Arikado reveals that if Soma destroys the flow of chaos into the castle, he will be able to escape his fate. After Soma succeeds, Arikado congratulates him.

In Dawn of Sorrow, Arikado battles Celia Fortner's cult, which wishes to revive the dark lord. Arikado saves Soma from certain death after Celia attempts to kill him personally, and instructs Soma not to pursue her. Soma ignores his directive, and travels to the cult's base. Arikado confronts him, and gives him a letter and talisman from Mina. Arikado later appears to stop Celia from using a doppelgänger to force Soma to become the dark lord, but is forced to let her leave after a revived Dmitrii Blinov threatens Soma's life. Arikado travels into the castle's basement, and attempts to stop Dmitrii. Dmitrii uses Celia as a sacrifice to seal Arikado's powers, leaving Soma to battle him. After Soma is victorious, Arikado reveals that he is not predestined to become the dark lord, and notes that one will emerge if necessary. Arikado becomes playable as Alucard if the player unlocks "Julius Mode".

Yoko Belnades
 is a witch in the service of the Church. She is a member of the Belnades clan, whose members are adept at magic, a trait they inherited from the clan's progenitor, Sypha Belnades. In both games, she is voiced by: Hiroko Takahashi in Japanese, and her English voice actor in Castlevania: Harmony of Despair is Karen Strassman. Yoko comes to Dracula's castle during the events of Aria of Sorrow to stop Graham Jones, whom she believes will inherit Dracula's powers. She solicits the aid of Soma Cruz, but is stabbed by Graham when he confronts her. She is saved by Arikado, and later thanks Soma for saving her, expressing her shock that he was Dracula's reincarnation.

Yoko returns in Dawn of Sorrow as an associate of Julius Belmont. However, Julius quickly abandons her to search the castle. Yoko teaches Soma the use of a Magic Seal, and offers to increase the power of his weapons by binding the souls under his dominance to them. Although Hammer is infatuated with her, she appears to be either oblivious or uncaring of his affections. She appears during the final cutscene at the end of the game. Yoko is playable in the game's "Julius Mode." and in Harmony of Despair as a DLC character.

Hammer
 is a member of the United States military that comes to the Hakuba shrine on orders from his superiors. He quickly abandons his mission when he is teleported into Dracula's castle, and on meeting Soma Cruz, becomes his vendor, serving as the game's in-game shop. During this time, he falls in love with Yoko Belnades, who does not reciprocate his affection. After Soma defeats the manifestation of chaos in the castle, he expresses his thanks to Soma, and says that he will quit the military to pursue his ambition of becoming a salesman.

After leaving the military, Hammer starts his work as an independent merchant, and acts as an information broker through his "shady business contacts." It is through this information that Soma discovers the location of Celia Fortner's base in Dawn of Sorrow. Hammer arrives, and promises to be Soma's vendor again. He stations his shop directly opposite Yoko's, and constantly hounds Soma over his infatuation with Yoko over the course of the game. He appears with the other characters at the end of the game during the final cutscene.

Graham Jones
 is the primary antagonist of Aria of Sorrow. He was born on the day of Dracula's death, giving him supernatural powers. He founded a religious sect preaching apocalyptic prophecies, and acted as its chief missionary. Graham arrives at Dracula's castle in Aria of Sorrow, believing that he will receive Dracula's powers due to being Dracula's reincarnation. He is forced to contend with Yoko Belnades and Julius Belmont, who have arrived at the castle to prevent Dracula's powers from falling into the wrong hands. Graham corners Yoko and stabs her, and begins to increase his powers by absorbing the castle's energy. He faces Soma in battle, partially mimicking Dracula's battle style and then transforming into a demonic creature. Soma manifests Dracula's powers, and is able to defeat Graham. His death forces Soma to absorb the energy Graham had been collecting, and realizes that he himself is Dracula's incarnation.

Celia Fortner
 is one of the antagonists of Dawn of Sorrow. She is the head of a cult seeking to revive the dark lord. Although she claims that she wishes to revive the dark lord to make God a completely good being, she desires a dark lord to prevent the loss of her magical powers. She recruits Dmitrii Blinov and Dario Bossi, the "dark lord's candidates," whom can become the new dark lord by destroying Dracula's soul. To do this, she attempts to kill Soma Cruz. Her initial attempts are foiled by Genya Arikado, and her candidates are defeated by Soma. In a final effort, she uses a dopplegänger posing as Mina Hakuba, Soma's childhood friend, and "kills" it to induce Soma to become the dark lord himself. Although this fails, Dmitrii, whose soul Soma had absorbed, escapes into the dopplegänger. She aids him in increasing his powers, but Dmitrii uses her as a sacrifice to seal Arikado's powers.

Dmitrii Blinov
 is one of the antagonists of Dawn of Sorrow. He is one of the "dark lord's candidates," or those born on the same day that Dracula died, bestowing upon him the power to duplicate the magical powers of others He joins Celia Fortner's cult, seeking to find the purpose behind his powers by becoming the new dark lord although he espouses no loyalty to Celia. He is defeated by Soma, who inadvertently absorbs Dmitrii's soul. Dmitrii uses this opportunity to copy Soma's "power of dominance," or his ability to use the abilities of the monsters he defeats. Dmitrii manages to escape Soma's body after Celia's attempt to turn Soma into the dark lord fails. He leaves with Celia, who summons monsters to increase his power. He then sacrifices Celia to remove the threat of Genya Arikado. Before he begins to battle Soma, Soma's power of dominance overwhelms his soul, and he dies when the monsters under his control escape his body.

Dario Bossi
 is one of the antagonists of Dawn of Sorrow. Similar to Dmitrii Blinov, Dario is one of the "dark lord's candidates," born on the day of Dracula's demise. This affords him supernatural powers, specifically pyrokinesis. This correlates with his personality, as he is quick to anger, and acts on his instincts. He is a wanted criminal, responsible for countless incidents of "inexplicable" arson. He joins Celia Fortner's cult, seeking to become the new dark lord by killing Soma Cruz. Soma defeats him in combat, and he is saved by Celia's intervention. Celia then binds a powerful fire demon named Aguni to his soul, which increases his powers. Dario confronts Julius Belmont and defeats him, as Julius cannot prevent Dario from regenerating all damage. He fights Soma once more, but Soma strips him of his powers by defeating Aguni, breaking the demon's bond to his soul.

Lament of Innocence

Leon Belmont

 was a baron in 11th-century Europe up to the events of Castlevania: Lament of Innocence. He lost both parents at a very young age, and was knighted at the age of 16. When his love interest Sara Trantoul is kidnapped by the vampire Walter Bernhard he enters the castle grounds unarmed, but is given a whip that is blessed with the power of alchemy by the old man Rinaldo Gandolfi, who lives on the grounds. Rinaldo also enchants Leon's left gauntlet with the power to absorb magical attacks. Using the whip and his magic gauntlet, he enters the castle hoping to rescue his fiancée.

Within the castle, Leon fights five guardians: Medusa, a Succubus, a Golem, the vampire Joachim Armster (Walter Bernhard's former ally), and an undead parasite. He gets a magical orb from each of them that unlocks the way to Walter's lair. When he gets past the initial barrier, Walter is there with Sara, who appears to be in some sort of trance. Walter returns Sara to Leon, who finds out that Sara has been tainted and will soon become a vampire. In an act of self-sacrifice, Sara offers her soul to Leon in a ritual that will make Rinaldo's magic whip deadly to vampires and thus allow Leon to defeat Walter. This is where the whip officially becomes "Vampire Killer."  Leon, armed with the powerful whip, Rinaldo's grief, and his anger for Sara's death, defeats Walter. However, Walter's death was in actuality orchestrated by Leon's friend Mathias Cronqvist to get Walter's Soul, and absorb its powers to become a powerful vampire through the Crimson Stone, (an artifact that allowed a person to steal a Vampire's soul and make their power theirs, at the price of becoming a vampire themselves) and Vampire Killer can now sense his having abandoned Humanity. He offers Leon eternal life, which Leon refuses, saying that eternal life would be empty without Sara. Mathias then sends his servant Death after Leon, who is defeated by him and gives him a message to pass on to Mathias. Leon swears that his clan and the whip he now carries will destroy Mathias one day, and from that day onward the Belmont clan would hunt the night.  Mathias would later be known as Dracula.

Leon appears in sprite form in Portrait of Ruin as one of the "Greatest Five".

Rinaldo Gandolfi
 is an alchemist whose daughter was taken and turned into a vampire by Walter Bernhard. He now lives in a small hut in the Forest of Eternal Night. Rinaldo creates the Whip of Alchemy for Leon to use in Walter's castle. This whip is later fused with the soul of Sara Trantoul to create the Vampire Killer, which would be present, in one form or another, in every Castlevania game.

Sara Trantoul
 is the fiancée of Leon Belmont. She is kidnapped by Walter Bernhard and bitten. Not wanting to become a vampire, she sacrifices herself to create the Vampire Killer whip.

Walter Bernhard
 is a vampire of unknown age. Having grown bored with eternal life, he decides to kidnap young maidens and play a game of Cat-and-mouse with the Hunters who come to rescue them, and attempt to destroy him. He is the antagonist of the game, luring the protagonist Baron Leon Belmont to his castle by kidnapping his fiancée, Sara Trantoul. The forest where he lives is called Eternal Night, as it is covered in unending darkness by the means of a jewel called the "Ebony Stone". In the end, Walter is defeated, and Mathias absorbs his soul.

Joachim Armster
 is another vampire who is kept prisoner by Walter in his castle. Joachim has a hatred for Walter and what he has done to him. As well as being a minor boss character, the game includes an unlockable secret mode where Joachim is a playable character; he has the ability to summon flying swords of darkness.

Order of Ecclesia

Shanoa
 is the most prodigious member of the Order of Ecclesia, a secret organization devoted to stop Dracula from reviving after the Belmont clan disappeared. She is also a glyph user, capable of absorbing sigil-like characters and using them as weapons. She is chosen by Barlowe to bear Dominus, a series of glyphs designed to destroy Dracula, but her fellow member Albus interferes during the ceremony and steals the glyphs. As a result, Shanoa becomes an amnesiac who is only able to simulate emotions (she cannot truly feel them).

After being retrained by Barlowe, Shanoa is dispatched to seek out and retrieve Dominus from Albus by any means necessary. As she travels, she slowly learns Albus's true intentions and the dark reality behind Ecclesia, but she is unable to stop the return of Dracula. With nothing left to her except her mission, Shanoa enters Dracula's castle and destroys the evil count using Dominus.

Albus
 is one of Ecclesia's veteran members. He wields a magically-infused flintlock pistol named Agartha that is capable of firing a variety of projectiles, and also has the ability to warp across short distances. Initially, Barlowe promised Albus that he would receive the Dominus seal, but changed his mind without his consent and chose Shanoa instead. After stealing Dominus from Ecclesia during the ceremony in which it was to be implanted within Shanoa, Albus flees with the glyph and becomes the enemy of Ecclesia. He spends much of the time researching the Dominus glyph and devising a way to incorporate it into himself. However, when he absorbs one part of the glyph (as he had given the other two away in order to observe how glyphs are absorbed) he is driven mad and Shanoa is forced to slay him.

If Shanoa kills Albus after rescuing all of the villagers, Albus will speak to her through Dominus and reveal his intentions in stealing the glyph. He had acted the way he did in order to protect Shanoa, who was raised as his younger sister, from the soul-stealing effects of the glyph, as channeling it would kill the user. He also has her promise not to use Dominus, as it would kill her. She also gains Albus' memories, some of which correlate with the ones she had lost. As it transpires, Albus's soul remains within Shanoa as she explores Dracula's castle, and he uses this opportunity to find a way to unlock her emotions, though her own memories are forever lost. When Shanoa uses Dominus to destroy Dracula, Albus offers his own soul as sacrifice, allowing Shanoa to live. Before his soul vanishes, Albus restores Shanoa's emotions and asks that she smile for him, which she manages before crying.

He is voiced by Keith Silverstein.

Barlowe
 is Ecclesia's leader, who has been tasked with seeking a way to combat Dracula's power in the absence of the Belmont clan. To this end, he created the Dominus glyph out of Dracula's power and was in the process of giving them to Shanoa when Albus interfered and made off with the glyphs. When Shanoa returns after learning the truth about Dominus and the cost for its use, Barlowe reveals that he himself has been corrupted by Dracula's power, and that his goal all along was to have Shanoa sacrifice her soul to Dracula through Dominus so the evil count can return once more. After Shanoa critically wounds him in battle, Barlowe uses the last of his strength to bring Dracula to life again.

Villagers of Wygol
In her travels, Shanoa encounters villagers from a location called Wygol, whom Albus captures and takes blood from in his studies on Dominus. After being rescued, the villagers will offer various side-quests for Shanoa to complete in exchange for money and special items. Shanoa must rescue all thirteen of the villagers in order to continue the storyline after defeating Albus.

After Albus's death, the villagers are revealed to be indirect descendants of the Belmont clan, and their blood is what allows Albus's soul to live within Shanoa after he himself is killed.

Judgment

According to Iga, "So as many of you know, the Castlevania timeline goes over 1000 years", "And there is a character trying to destroy that timeline. Due to magic forces, a variety of characters from different eras are brought together."

Aeon
 is a time-obsessed warrior with no era to call his own. He pulled together various heroes and villains from different eras into a time rift to collect soul keys, and to find a champion to stop the Time Reaper from destroying the universe. Of note is that Aeon utters some of the Same lines used by Time Traveler Saint Germain in Castlevania: Curse of Darkness, an association between the two characters is not implicitly stated.

Time Reaper
The Time Reaper is a being sent from 10,000 years in the future by Galamoth to destroy Dracula and the timeline.

Order of Shadows

While the team members worked actively with IGA to ensure the game was consistent with the canon, Order of Shadows is considered a side story to the Castlevania canon.

Desmond, Zoe and Dolores Belmont
Desmond Belmont is the main character of Order of Shadows. Zoe and Dolores Belmont are the sisters of Desmond. Dolores is the youngest of the three vampire hunter siblings. She is equally capable of handling the Vampire Killer Whip, though she is not of age yet.

Giovanni
Giovanni is a descendant of Rinaldo Gandolfi who aided the Belmont Clan in tracking The Order in the game Order of Shadows. The Belmont sisters came upon the Alchemic Gauntlet in the Order's possession and he tells them that it will be able to give its owner the ability to use alchemical artifacts.

Rohan Krause
Rohan Krause is the leader of The Order who attempts to resurrect Dracula in the late 17th Century. He claims to have killed Desmond Belmont's father even though he had the Vampire Killer Whip. He is a master of alchemy and was in possession of the Magic Gauntlet which Rinaldo had given Leon Belmont centuries ago. He plotted to resurrect Dracula using a blood sacrifice and planned to serve at his side. However, the Belmont's and their allies were able to track down the order long before they were ready to revive the Dark Lord properly. He is defeated at the hand of Desmond, who indicated that he was only seeking the prevention of Dracula's revival, not revenge for what he had done to his father. Though his dreams of being one of Dracula's right hand men during his reign was shattered, his own blood was sufficient to raise his lord and Desmond had to battle an early risen Dracula shortly afterwards.

Lords of Shadow

Lords of Shadow is being described as a reboot of the franchise; it is not part of the main series' timeline.

Gabriel Belmont
 is the central character of the Lords of Shadow series. He is a member of the Brotherhood of Light, an elite group of holy knights who protect and defend the innocent against the supernatural. He learns of a Mask which has the power to bring back the dead, and contemplates on using it to revive his recently murdered wife.

As an infant he was found abandoned at the door of one of the Brotherhood of the Light convents. It is not known who his original parents were. Some suspect he was the unwanted child of a local wealthy landowner, most likely from the Cronqvist family, though this has never been proven. The Order named the boy after the blessed Archangel Gabriel and raised him as one of their own. The precocious child quickly proved to be extremely talented, developing a mastery of the fighting arts unprecedented in the Brotherhood. Gabriel took the surname of Belmont, due to his love for mountains and the high places of the world. The name Belmont is of French origin, and it means "beautiful mountain". The name is the union of two French words: bel, meaning beautiful and mont meaning mountain.

Prone to dark moods and occasional ambivalence, Gabriel was deeply affected by the death of his childhood sweetheart, Marie. Gabriel has embarked on this journey at the request of the elders of the Brotherhood, rejecting the help of his comrades and stoking a burning desire for revenge. In a post-credits scene, Gabriel is shown to have become the powerful vampire lord Dracula and subsequently the second game explores his quest for redemption and goal to put an end to his immortal existence.

Gabriel is voiced in all three games by Scottish actor Robert Carlyle.

Zobek
 is a mysterious swordsman who encourages Gabriel to use The Mask to bring back his dead wife Marie.

If the recorded chronicles of the Brotherhood are to be believed, Zobek is one of their longest-serving warriors. The list of heroic deeds attributed to him is as impressive as his vast knowledge of the art of war or indeed the mighty fighting skills he can deploy, despite his age.

His weapon of choice is a simple long sword which he handles with skill and alacrity. Strangely, he likes to use an old-fashioned uniform of the Brotherhood of Light that, according to him, was inherited from one of his ancestors; one of the founding members of the Brotherhood of Light. In reality, he is the dark side left by one of the founding members of the order, the Lord of the Dead. This has led to speculation that he is this universe's Death which is confirmed by the producers.

Voiced by Patrick Stewart.

Marie Belmont
 is Gabriel's beloved wife. She was brutally murdered by the evil forces of darkness and her soul was trapped for eternity. Her spirit guides him on his quest to rid the land of evil.

Voiced by Natascha McElhone.

Pan
 is the ancient Greek god of the old forest who may hold a clue to the circumstances surrounding the death of Gabriel's wife. Pan has contacted the Brotherhood of the Light to tell them that Marie Belmont calls from the other side and wishes to speak to her husband, so Gabriel searches for Pan's hidden grotto to seek the truth. During Gabriel's journey, Pan assumes several forms including a horse, an eagle, and an armor-clad knight.

Voiced by Aleksander Mikic.

Claudia
 is a mysterious barefoot mute girl who has the ability to speak to Gabriel telepathically. when they first meet she keeps hiding and running away from Gabriel, but later wants to help him in his journey. after she decides to help, she requests that he find several crystals to fight against the supernatural creatures.

She is later known to be one of the last Aghartians, a now-extinct race that created vast technologies ahead of its time; they were later wiped out after the lords of shadow took over the earth.

She is guarded by her Golem knight fabricated by her father shortly before his death, the golem lives on dead souls of supernatural creatures.

Voiced by Emma Ferguson.

Baba Yaga
, a mysterious old hag, who is later seen as a mystical witch. She will help Gabriel but wants a blue rose to make her young again for a temporary amount of time.

She is known to be wicked but will help someone as long as they help her in return.

Voiced by Eve Karpf.

Satan
 is the main antagonist of the series, and plotted all of the events of the first game. He is also the final boss.

Satan's primary motivation seems to be to have his vengeance against God for being cast out of Heaven. He reveals himself as the manipulator of the first game's events in the end. After he is defeated by Gabriel Belmont, he drops the God Mask, which Gabriel uses to speak to his deceased wife for a short time. He reappears in Lords of Shadow 2, where he serves as the main antagonist and final boss again. After his Acolytes manage to summon him to the mortal world, this time Satan chooses to possess Alucard, the son of Gabriel, who is now known as the powerful vampire Dracula. After his defeat, he flees from Alucard's body and is killed by Dracula, who uses his old Vampire Killer weapon to deliver the final blow.

Voiced by Jason Isaacs.

Victor Belmont
Victor Belmont is a descendant of Gabriel Belmont, although his exact relation is unknown. Victor claims to be the last of the Belmont lineage.

Voiced by Anthony Howell.

Toy Maker

At a time, the Toy Maker was the brightest pupil of Rinaldo Gandolfi;  Though, he much preferred to build toys for children and the skill that gave him his name made him legendary across the lands.  However, hearing of his skill was Walter Bernhard, a member of the Bernhard family who offered the Toy Maker a place in his Castle to make his craft.

In time, the Toy Maker realized that Walter came from a family of dark occultists. Walter summoned a demon to possess the Toy Maker's kindly soul, thereby twisting his craft in the darkest way and making weapons of death and destruction, some being the Dark Pain, the Stopwatch, the Macabre Puppet, and Gargoyles.

The demon, however, was unable to completely corrupt the Toy Maker's soul, resulting in something of a split personality; the original kind old man and the childish, sadistic demon within. Sometime during this period, the Toy Maker was touched by the puppet of a child seeking to free his soul from the demon and escape Walter Bernhard. He then discovered he had regained his innocence and Walter removed his heart, putting the Toy Maker into a deep slumber.

His fate is unknown when Carmilla took over the castle, and only then until Gabriel Belmont, rechristened as Dracula, took over as well.

Voiced by Mark Healy.

Agreus

Agreus is the brother of the deceased Pan, coming to Dracula's Castle to seek revenge against his killer, the vampire lord Dracula. First Agreus lures Dracula into the Castle's gardens with a fragment of the Mirror of Fate knowing that he would seek the fragment for his son Trevor Belmont. As Dracula attempts to claim the fragment, Agreus steals it from him and informs the vampire that he intends to avenge Pan's death. Dracula tries to reason with Agreus that his brother chose to sacrifice himself for a cause that he believed in, but Agreus retorts that Pan only died to serve his quest for power. Declaring that Dracula would pay for what he had done, Agreus retreats into the maze, goading the vampire to follow him.

Now trapped inside the maze with the vengeful God, Dracula is forced to evade him in order to escape. Agreus taunts the vampire, claiming that he would relish hunting him down but Dracula manages to avoid him long enough to reclaim the fragment from his Owl Familiar. Enraged, Agreus vows to destroy Dracula and challenges him to a final battle. Eventually the two warriors tumble off the edge of the cliff but Dracula uses Agreus to break his fall. With the Old God weakened and unable to fight back, Dracula proceeds to crush Agreus' skull, killing him.

Voiced by Aleksander Mikic.

Gorgon Sisters

The Gorgon Sisters, Stheno, Euryale, and Medusa are a trio of Old God females who take on the macabre appearances of young girls while having snake-like appendages flailing out of their bodies, which resulted from centuries of living and staying together underground in the City of the Damned. They keep the Chaos claws that Gabriel needs for his journey. Euryale and Stheno provide tips and warnings for Gabriel, but by the time they reunite with their sister, it is discovered that Medusa has been infected with the Castle's Evil Blood. She spreads it to her sisters and the three transform into a single three-headed Gorgon titan that Gabriel kills after slicing off two of its heads and extracting its heart, turning the creature into stone.

Voiced by Mimi Keene.

Raisa Volkova

Raisa Volkova is the head of the Bioquimek Corporation facility and one of Satan's acolytes. She encounters and does battle with Dracula twice throughout the game. Five months prior to Dracula's return her corporation went into lockdown so that she and her subordinates can perfect the virus that can turn anyone into demonic monsters. Her weak form is that of a reptilian demon but her true form is a large winged creature, resembling a sphinx with red sharp claws and purple feathers. Known as the "Daughter of Satan", she manipulates energy to fight Dracula. She is killed by Dracula's Void Sword later on in battle.

Voiced by Alex Childs.

References

Castlevania